Phyllodromia is a genus of dance flies (insects in the family Empididae). There are about 10 described species in Phyllodromia.

Species
These 10 species belong to the genus Phyllodromia:
P. americana Melander, 1947
P. falcata Plant, 2005
P. flexura Plant, 2005
P. floridula Plant, 2005
P. fusca (Bezzi, 1914)
P. melanocephala (Fabricius, 1794)
P. nigricoxa Plant, 2005
P. proiecta Plant, 2005
P. scopulifera Collin, 1928
P. striata Collin, 1928

References

External links

 

Empididae
Articles created by Qbugbot
Empidoidea genera